Olesya Mashina is a former Russian football midfielder, who played for Rossiyanka in the Russian Championship. She has also played the Champions League with Energiya Voronezh. A member of the Russian national team since 2011, as a junior international she won the 2005 U-19 European Championship.

References

1987 births
Living people
Russian women's footballers
Russia women's international footballers
SKA Rostov-on-Don (women) players
Ryazan-VDV players
FC Energy Voronezh players
WFC Rossiyanka players
Women's association football defenders
Women's association football midfielders